Konstantin Konstantinovich Kuzminsky (16 April 1940 – 2 May 2015) was a Russian performance poet.

Born in Leningrad, Kuzminsky emigrated from the Soviet Union in 1978. He published "The Blue Lagoon Anthology of Modern Russian Poetry". Other publications include a collection of Russian poetry "The Living Mirror". He appeared in several documentary films, among them two by Andrei Zagdansky:  Vasya, a portrait of a close friend and Russian/Soviet nonconformist artist Vasily Sitnikov and Konstantin and Mouse a.k.a. "Kostya and Mouse", a double-portrait of Konstantin Kuzminsky and his wife Emma, nicknamed Mouse.

Kuzminsky died in the United States on 2 May 2015.

References

KUZ'MINSKIĬ, K. K., KOVALËV, G. L., & BOWLT, J. E. (1980). The Blue Lagoon anthology of modern Russian poetry. Newtonville, Mass, Oriental Research Partners.

External links
 Upstate Quest for a Russian Soul; The Avant-Garde, Bearing Bread, Seeks Out a Mentor By Susan Sachs New York Times
"Kostya and Mouse", a documentary by Andrei Zagdansky
IMDB.com entry referencing K. Kuzminsky as himself credit in the A. Zagdansky documentary
"The Blue Lagoon Anthology of Modern Russian Poetry", current on-line version

External links
 

Russian male poets
1940 births
2015 deaths
American people of Russian descent
People from Delaware County, New York
20th-century Russian poets
20th-century Russian male writers